Hewison is a surname. Notable people with the surname include:

Bob Hewison (1889–1964), English footballer
Christopher Hewison (born 1979), English cricketer
George Hewison (born 1944), folk singer, trade unionist, member of the Communist Party of Canada
Kevin Hewison, political scientist
Robert Hewison (born 1943), British cultural historian

See also
Hewison v Meridian Shipping Services Pte Ltd, English tort law case, concerning an employer's liability for an employee's illegal acts
Hewison Point forms the east side of Ferguson Bay and the southeast end of Thule Island, in the South Sandwich Islands
Steve Huison (born 1963), British actor, mostly on TV and occasional films
Hewitson
Hewitsonia
Hewson